Pretoria peace agreement may refer to:

 Pretoria Convention (1880–1881): treaty that ended the First Boer War
 Treaty of Vereeniging (1902): signed in Pretoria; ended the Second Boer War
 Pretoria Accord (2002): agreement that aimed to end the Second Congo War
 Pretoria Agreement (2005): treaty to end the First Ivorian Civil War
 Ethiopia–Tigray peace agreement (2022): signed in Pretoria; treaty to end the Tigray War